Burim may refer to:

Burim, an Albanian name for Istok, a town and municipality in north-western Kosovo.
Burim, a village in the Korçë district of south-eastern Albania.
Burim, a village and an Early Neolithic settlement in the municipality Maqellarë, in north-eastern Albania.
Burim (name), a common Albanian masculine given name.